The Fiat-Abarth 750 is a compact sporting series of automobiles manufactured by the Italian manufacturing firm Abarth & C. of Turin, Italy in the 1950s and 1960s. The cars used the floorpan and often the bodywork of the Fiat 600 but were fitted with Abarth's modified engines. Abarth also offered a number of bodyworks by other designers for the 750 and its derivatives, most famously Zagato but also Allemano and others.

There were also other derivatives, which were sold as the Fiat-Abarth 850, Fiat-Abarth 1000, and Abarth Monomille (1000 pushrod). For the 1960 Gran Turismo racing season the classes were changed to under 700 or under 1000 cc, while national competitions also featured an 850 cc class. Abarth responded with engines suitable for the new classes, although the 700 may have only been built in one or two examples. Depending on the state of tune, these then received additional letters to their names, such as TC or TCR. A twin-cam version, the "Bialbero", was also produced.

Abarth 210 A Spyder
Abarth's first model based on the Fiat 600 was the 210 A Spyder, which first appeared in late 1955 - soon after the introduction of the 600 itself. Using the standard 600's bottom plate and a modified engine, its sleek bodywork was by Boano. It has a low-cut windscreen, vestigial rear fins, and a single center mounted headlight. The  engine offers  while an enlarged   option was also available. Both engines have a 9.5:1 compression ratio, dual exhausts, and reach their max power at 6900 rpm.

Abarth 215 A Coupé & 216 A Spyder
In 1956 Abarth presented twin concept models, based on Fiat 600 chassis with  engine. Both were designed by Franco Scaglione at Bertone. Abarth 215 A Coupé was a closed variant presented at the Geneva Motor Show and the following open-top spider had its first premiere in Turin. Both cars had large protruding tailfins and pop-up headlights.

750

Abarth offered their 750 cc derivative of the Fiat 600 both with the original ("Berlina") bodywork and with more slippery bodywork from others. Most famous is the aerodynamic Zagato-bodied range of Abarth 750 cars. As a footnote, failing Fiat modifiers Siata were owned by Abarth from 1959 until 1961. Siata's own 600-based "Amica" design and  engine conversion was thus marketed as the Siata-Abarth 750 during those years, but there was little to no actual Abarth involvement with these cars.

750 Gran Turismo / Berlina
Appearing in early 1956, Abarth's 750 Gran Turismo Derivazione was the first Abarth product to use the standard Fiat bodywork. Fiat delivered these cars incomplete, to make it easier and more cost effective for Abarth to carry out their performance modifications. Rather than the  original or Abarth's own  model, the engine now displaced  thanks to a one millimetre wider bore and a stroke increased by four millimetres ( respectively).

750 Zagato

Originally the aerodynamic 750 Zagato "double bubble" had a single-cam engine. This was first presented at the 1955 Turin Motor Show. The original model was also offered in a more luxurious variant for export (called "America", as it was almost strictly meant for the United States) and a stripped down model with lower, uncovered headlamps and smaller taillights for the domestic Italian market. The "America" also has a different layout around the rear license plate. Aside from the floorpan, not much of the Fiat 600 remains in use for these cars. By the time of the appearance of the Abarth Zagato Record Monza 750 Bialbero, the bodywork had been unified into a separate model with a rather large hump on the engine lid, made necessary by the taller twin-cam motor. There were then three distinct models: 750 "Double Bubble," 750 Record Monza, and 750 "Sestriere." The Sestriere had a single cam pushrod engine, and the majority were built with a steel body, a very small number of alloy cars, and there is one aluminium car known to exist today. The Sestriere had upright headlights, and two very large air intakes on the engine lid, much wider than a double bubble. (The Sestriere was believed to be the last model produced for Abarth by Zagato, due to disagreements between Abarth and Zagato.)

The first series constituted 100 cars, enough to homologate the car for the Gran Turismo competition category. 750 Bialbero-equipped Fiat-Abarth Zagato Record Monzas featured a lower roof with no bubbles and one single centered air scoop on the engine lid. "The Record Monza" was the most successful racing Abarth in the USA with the Franklin D. Roosevelt Jr Racing team, (Abarth cars winning over 700 races worldwide), including both Sebring with the  Bialbero engine and Daytona under- races in 1959 widely believed to have had the first  Bialbero engine.

There was also a very rare Zagato Spyder version produced, only between two and four examples are believed to have been built. This model was first shown at the 1957 Turin Auto Show, and it was then shown again the next year. The design has the usual sleek Zagato front end, with distinct fins at the rear. The bump on the engine lid came in for some period critique for disfiguring the overall design. The Spyder's list price in Italy was the same as for the berlinetta Zagato, 1,535,000 Lira in 1958. The 1958 Turin Show car had the twin cam engine, with similar performance to the berlinetta, although the "little castle" disfiguring the engine lid was even larger on this model.

Abarth 700S 
To suit newly reshuffled Gran Turismo racing categories, a  version was introduced at the 1959 Turin Auto Show. The Twin Cam ("Bialbero") model produces  at 7,100 rpm. One of these, with Zagato-style bodywork, did start at the 1960 Le Mans but it only managed 31 laps. This model may have remained a single example, while the 850 and 1000 models which arrived around the same time went on to be built for many more years.

850

850 Allemano 

The Abarth 850 Spider has bodywork by Allemano and was first shown in the spring of 1960. The engine is a Fiat-based 850 single-cam unit which develops  CUNA at 6,000 rpm. A coupé model was also later developed, more elegant and comfortable than Zagato's version but heavier and less sporting.

Allemano's bodywork was later also made available with the larger 1000 engine. This bodywork was also used by Cisitalia's Argentinian daughter company, who built the car in a variety of models with 760, 800, or 850 cc engines.

850TC Berlina 

The Fiat-Abarth 850TC Berlina (Turismo Competizione, or "touring competition") was introduced towards the end of 1960. It uses the Fiat 600 bodywork with some modifications, most notably a boxlike structure ahead of the front bumper which held the engine's oil cooler. The rear fenders were usually blistered, so as to accommodate larger wheels. The engine is a four-cylinder model based on a Fiat unit, with 847 cc capacity and  CUNA rating. The 850TC remained in the price lists until 1966.

The name was intended to celebrate the class victory of an Abarth 850TC at the 1961 Nürburgring 500 km race. There followed the 850TC/SS with two more horsepower; this was renamed the 850TC Nürburgring Corsa towards the end of the year.

Between 1962 and 1971 the 850cc and 1,000cc class cars won hundreds of races all over the World and were commonly called "Giant Killers" due to their superior performance over much larger cars. This culminated in a famous dispute with SCCA authorities in the USA when Alfred Cosentino (FAZA) was banned from running his 1970 Fiat Abarth Berlina Corsa 1000 TCR "Radiale" engine because his car was faster (mainly in wet conditions) than many of its V8-powered contemporaries. The SCCA authorities dictated FAZA and Cosentino be forced to use an earlier, non-Radiale, engine design from the 1962 model in their cars. They still achieved 51 victories from 53 races, the most victories in SCCA racing history, thereby cementing the superiority of the Fiat Abarth Berlina Corsa over larger and more powerful cars.

1000

1000 Zagato 

The first Fiat 600-based Abarth to be fitted with the larger 982 cc development of the 600 engine was the Zagato-bodied Berlinetta, similar in appearance to the 750 and 850 Monza models. It was first shown at the October 1960 Paris Motor Show and produces  at 7,100 rpm. Twin Weber carburetors and a 9.3 to 1 compression ratio help reach this considerable output for a one-litre engine. A bewildering variety of slightly different bodystyle elements appeared over the years, with covered and uncovered headlights, different engine lids, taillights, and window arrangements, as well as a later long-tailed design which also received a longer nosecone. Since these cars were largely handbuilt and often to order, it is hard to say what is original and what may have been modified after many years of competition.

Monomille

The Monomille also has the pushrod 982 cc motor and was sold alongside the twin-cam Bialbero as a lower-priced, less complicated alternative. Bodywork was in the style of Zagato's, although it was executed by Abarth themselves. The cars carry a "Carrozzeria Abarth" badge.

1000 TC/TCR Berlina 
It may seem strange that a 1000 cc economy car with 85 bhp can be considered a racing car, but in its day, the Abarth 1000 TC and all its variants were fierce racing machines with international success and acclaim. The Abarth story is long and full of racing victories in various events, across the post-war years. Carlo Abarth made his name tuning and racing Fiat models in smaller classes and in Le Mans, but the 1000 TC was maybe the most famous and versatile of all of his creations.

List of names 
This is a list of the various models available that retained the standard "Berlina" bodywork:
 1956–1959 : Fiat derivazione Abarth 750,    Berlina (stradale)
 December 1960–January 1961: Fiat derivazione Abarth 850, Berlina (stradale)
 February 1961–December 1964: Fiat Abarth 850 TC Berlina (stradale)
 November 1961–December 1964: Fiat Abarth 850 TC Nurburgring Berlina (stradale)
 July 1962–December 1964: Fiat Abarth 1000 Berlina (stradale)                           
 1963–1969: Fiat Abarth 1000 Berlina Corsa -gr.2
 1963–1969: Fiat Abarth 850 TC Corsa -gr.2
 1968–1969: Fiat Abarth 1000 TCR (Radiale - "pendolare") -gr.5
 1968–1969: Fiat Abarth  850 TCR (Radiale - "pendolare") -gr.5
 1970: Fiat Abarth 1000 TCR (Radiale . "pendolare" - larga) gr. 2

References

External links 

Abarth 750
750
1950s cars
1960s cars
Group 4 (racing) cars